Rose Emma Salaman (also Collins;  – 23 December 1898) was an English poet and translator.

She was born in London to Jewish parents Alice (née Cowen) and Simeon Kensington Salaman. Her thirteen siblings included Charles Kensington, Rachel, Annette, and Julia Salaman. On 12 May 1857, she married Judah (Julius) Collins, a surgeon and warden of the Western Marble Arch Synagogue, whose brother was architect .

Salaman's work appeared in numerous British and American periodicals during the 1840s and 1850s, including Isaac Leeser's Occident and American Jewish Advocate. Her only published volume of poetry was Poems by R. E. S. (1853), dedicated to physiologist Marshall Hall. The work was well-received by critics, and was reportedly the only book accepted by Queen Victoria in the year of mourning following Prince Albert's death in 1861.

Bibliography

References

1815 births
1898 deaths
19th-century English women writers
19th-century English poets
19th-century Sephardi Jews
British women hymnwriters
English Jewish writers
English women poets
German–English translators
Hebrew–English translators
Jewish poets
Jewish women writers
Rose Emma Salaman
People from London